Wenona Hall and Wecota Hall at South Dakota State University in Brookings, South Dakota are women's dormitories that were built in 1909 and 1915.  John J. Schwartz was architect.  The combination was listed on the U.S. National Register of Historic Places in 1980.

The buildings were deemed to be "significant in the areas of architecture and education" and "good examples of early 20th century academic architecture";  Schwartz is held to have achieved "balance and order" in using neoclassical architecture despite constraints of large scale and many necessary window openings.

References

University and college buildings on the National Register of Historic Places in South Dakota
Neoclassical architecture in South Dakota
School buildings completed in 1915
Buildings and structures in Brookings, South Dakota
South Dakota State University
National Register of Historic Places in Brookings County, South Dakota
1915 establishments in South Dakota